Yifeng Liu (born July 19, 1985 in Shanghai, China) is a Chinese professor of mathematics at Zhejiang University specializing in number theory, automorphic forms and arithmetic geometry.

Career
Liu received his BS Degree from Peking University in 2007 and PhD degree from Columbia University, New York, in 2012 under the direction of Shou-Wu Zhang.  He was a C.L.E. Moore Instructor at MIT from 2012 to 2015 and an assistant professor at Northwestern University from 2015 to 2018 before being appointed an associate professor at Yale University. Liu returned to China in 2021 to join Zheijiang University became a full professor of mathematics.

Liu has made important contributions to arithmetic geometry and number theory.  His contributions span a wide spectrum of topics such as arithmetic theta lifts and derivatives of L-functions, the Gan–Gross–Prasad conjecture and its arithmetic counterpart, the Beilinson–Bloch–Kato conjecture, the geometric Langlands program, the p-adic Waldspurger theorem, and the study of étale cohomology on Artin stacks.

Awards
He received a Sloan Research Fellowship in 2017.

He was awarded the 2018 SASTRA Ramanujan Prize for his contributions to the field of mathematics. He shared the prize with Jack Thorne.

References

External link
Yifeng Liu's personal homepage

1985 births
Living people
Mathematicians from Shanghai
21st-century Chinese mathematicians
Peking University alumni
Columbia University alumni
Massachusetts Institute of Technology School of Science faculty
Northwestern University faculty
Yale University faculty
Chinese emigrants to the United States
Educators from Shanghai
Arithmetic geometers
Sloan Research Fellows